Zeytinburnu Stadı is a football stadium, home ground of the Turkish Regional Amateur League team Zeytinburnuspor since 1984, located in Zeytinburnu, Istanbul. The stadium is an all-seater stadium and holds a total capacity of 16,000 people and is uncovered.

The stadium briefly housed the Turkish Third League team İstanbulspor A.Ş. in 2004.

The stadium is occasionally in use for public holiday ceremonies.

References

External links
 Zeytinburnu Stadium Profile at TFF 

Football venues in Turkey
Zeytinburnuspor
Zeytinburnu
Sports venues in Istanbul